The Statue of Napoleon in the Place du Général-de-Gaulle, Rouen, Normandy was erected in 1865. The equestrian statue was sculpted in bronze by Gabriel-Vital Dubray, and its pedestal was designed by Louis Desmarest. It stands in front of the city hall.

In 1881, during the Third French Republic, the city's administration saw the statue of the emperor as contrary to their values. There were plans to melt it into a new statue of an effigy of the republic, or to remove the man and leave only the horse; these plans did not come to fruition due to lack of funds.

In June 2020, the statue was taken down for repairs. Fractures in the hoof of the horse meant that it could have fallen down. A treasure chest of bronze, silver and gold coins of Napoleon III – Napoleon's nephew and reigning emperor at the time of inauguration – was found inside the pedestal. In September, mayor Nicolas Mayer-Rossignol (Socialist) wished to replace it with a statue or work of art dedicated to the recently deceased feminist Gisèle Halimi. The plans were strongly opposed by the leader of the city's opposition, Jean-François Bures. Historian Thierry Lentz, director of the Fondation Napoléon, called the plans "cancel culture" and argued that Napoleon was a benefactor of Rouen, making him more locally relevant than Halimi. In December 2021, a survey of 4,080 residents found that 68% wanted the statue to remain, and the city council said it would respect the result.

Later in December 2021, the statue was registered as a monument historique.

References

Rouen
Rouen
Napoleon
Napoleon
Napoleon
Monuments historiques of Seine-Maritime